Witold Jakóbczyk (15 January 1909 in Sosnowiec – 3 October 1986 in Poznań) was a Polish historian and professor at Poznań University, specializing in the history of Greater Poland in the 19th century.

Publications 
 
 
 
 Witold Jakóbczyk (ed.), Studia nad dziejami Wielkopolski w XIX w., vol.I–III, Poznań 1951–1967.
 Witold Jakóbczyk (ed.), Wielkopolanie XIX w., Poznań 1969.
 Witold Jakóbczyk (ed.), Wielkopolska. Wybór źródeł, t. I 1815–1850, Wrocław 1952.
 Witold Jakóbczyk (ed.), Wielkopolska. Wybór źródeł, t. II 1851–1914, Wrocław 1954.

See also 
 History of Poznań
 Greater Poland
 Grand Duchy of Poznań

1909 births
1986 deaths
People from Sosnowiec
20th-century Polish historians
Polish male non-fiction writers
History of Greater Poland
Historians of Poland
Adam Mickiewicz University in Poznań alumni
Academic staff of Adam Mickiewicz University in Poznań
Recipients of the Order of Polonia Restituta